Erik Pondal Jensen (6 December 1930 – 16 July 1960) was a Danish footballer who played as a midfielder. He played in 20 matches for the Denmark national team from 1954 to 1959.

References

1930 births
1960 deaths
Danish men's footballers
Association football midfielders
Denmark international footballers
HB Køge players
Akademisk Boldklub players
People from Køge
Footballers killed in the 1960 Danish football air crash
Sportspeople from Region Zealand